This article concerns the period 739 BC – 730 BC.

Events and trends
 739 BC—Hiram II succeeds Ithobaal II as king of Tyre.
 738 BC—King Tiglath-Pileser III of Assyria invades Israel, forcing it to pay tribute.
 738 BC—The Biskupin settlement northeast of Poznań (Poland) is built.
 737 and 736 BC—King Tiglath-Pileser III of Assyria invades Iran, conquering the Medes and Persians and slaughtering, enslaving or deporting many.
 736 BC—Leochares of Messenia wins the stadion race at the eleventh Olympic Games.
 735 BC—Naxos in Sicily founded as a colony of Chalcis in Euboea. (traditional date)
 734 BC—Syracuse founded in Sicily as a joint colony of Corinth and Tenea, under the leadership of Archias of Corinth.
 733 BC—King Tiglath-Pileser III of Assyria conquers the Northern Kingdom of Israel (Samaria), and exiles its inhabitants.
 732 BC—King Tiglath-Pileser III of Assyria seizes Damascus, executes Rezin, King of the Arameans, and deports the Aramaean inhabitants to Kir of Moab. (probable date)
 732 BC—King Tiglath-Pileser III of Assyria defeats the Arab queen Samsi in battle and forces her to pay tribute to him.
 732 BC—Hoshea becomes the last king of Israel.
 732 BC—Oxythemis of Cleonae/Coroneia wins the stadion race at the twelfth Olympic Games.
 730 BC—Northern Egypt ceases to be ruled by Libyan pharaohs.
 730 BC—Osorkon IV succeeds Pedubast II as king of the Twenty-second Dynasty of Egypt. (approximate date)
 730 BC—Piye succeeds his father, Kashta, as king of the Nubian kingdom of Napata.
 730 BC—Mattan II succeeds Hiram II as king of Tyre.
 730 BC—Leontini in Sicily is founded by colonists from Naxos.

Significant people
 Xuan Jiang, Chinese Duchess.

References